Lake Tuggeranong, an artificial lake sourced by the confluence of Tuggeranong Creek and stormwater discharge from urban and rural areas, is located in the Tuggeranong district of Canberra, within the Australian Capital Territory, Australia.

The lake is situated adjacent to the Tuggeranong Town Centre, and is bounded by the suburbs of Bonython in the south-east and Kambah in the north-west.

Features
Lake Tuggeranong was created by the construction of a dam in 1987 coinciding with urban development in the district.  The lake was built as a sediment trap for soil and debris, and to improve the quality of the water flowing into the Murrumbidgee River. Tuggeranong Creek feeds the Isabella Pond, that then flows into Lake Tuggeranong. The water quality of the lake is monitored by health and environmental agencies, and is subject to health hazards such as toxic blue-green algal blooms or high faecal bacteria counts, given the urban and rural runoff of the lake source.

The lake is a popular recreational site. The foreshore of the lake is parkland, with swimming, fishing, wind-surfing and non-motorised boating all possible activities on the lake.

See also

Lake Tuggeranong College
Tuggeranong Arts Centre
Stranger Pond

References

Dams completed in 1987
Murrumbidgee River
Tuggeranong
Tuggeranong
Tuggeranong